Aminath Suha Musthafa (born 7 May 1997), commonly known as Aminath Shuha is a Maldivian film actress and former TV presenter.

Career
Prior to acting, Shuha worked as a show presenter and host in several television programs from Ice TV. For her presentation in of the shows Loabin (2017), she was attracted to negative reception from the audience, due to her flirtatious behavior which she attributed as "required as per the concept of the show".

She made her film debut with the second season of Ravee Farooq-directed web series Ehenas (2020) where she played the role of Zoya, a supportive figure to a bullied and sexually abused male victim. Ifraz Ali from Dho? reviewing the second season of the series noted her character to be "futile" and "holds no value" in terms of narration. She next starred in Mohamed Aboobakuru-directed family drama Sirru (2021) which received mixed reviews from critics, where Ahmed Rasheed from MuniAvas was generally in favor of the screenplay and wrote of the initial episodes and wrote: "The series narrates a common and relatable storyline from a different perspective", while other critics found it to be "too cliché" and lacks "emotion".

In 2022, Shuha collaborated with Ilyas Waheed for a brief role in the last chapter tiled "Hintha" from the four-part anthology web series Mazloom which was considered a "benchmark project" in the industry. She then played the role of Mauna in the office comedy sitcom Office Loabi developed by Amyna Mohamed. The series along with her performance received positive reviews from critics, where Mariyam Waheedha from Dhen called her role to be "distinct" from the cast. She next collaborated with Mohamed Aboobakuru for Ali Shazleem-directed family drama Rimsha where she played the role of Mariyam, an underprivileged island girl who moves to Male' City and wrecks a happy marriage for the sake of wealth and money. Afterwards, she worked with Yoosuf Shafeeu for the first chapter of the thriller web series E Series. Titled Baby, Shuha played the role of Zeyba, a woman who is accused by her husband to be involved in an extramarital affair. Upon release, the three episode limited series met with positive reviews from critics, where Saajid Abdulla from MuniAvas particularly praised the performance of the lead actors.

Filmography

Television

References

External links
 

Living people
1997 births
People from Malé
21st-century Maldivian actresses
Maldivian film actresses